Penrose is a small town in the Southern Highlands of New South Wales, Australia, in Wingecarribee Shire.  It has a station on the Main Southern railway line served by NSW TrainLink's Southern Highlands Line. 

At the 2021 census, there were 263 people recorded.

Penrose also has a small general store, a cafe, rural fire brigade, a primary school and a timber mill.

Notes and references

Towns of the Southern Highlands (New South Wales)
Wingecarribee Shire